Mustafa Cengiz (25 December 1949 – 28 November 2021) was a Former Bureaucrat and Turkish businessman who served as the president of sports club Galatasaray S.K.

Early life
Mustafa Cengiz was born in Nizip, Gaziantep Province, southeastern Turkey on 25 December 1949.

Mustafa Cengiz completed his primary and secondary education in his hometown. He then graduated from Gaziantep High School. Then he studied at Faculty of Political Science, Ankara University.

Career
Cengiz became a founding specialist in foreign trade for a cooperative of agriculture (Köy-Koop). At the age of 28, he became the general manager of the central economic organization founded by  670 municipalities (TANSA) as the youngest executive in the public sector. Following the 1980 military coup, he went to foreign trade in the private sector working in the Middle East countries using his Arabic language knowledge.

From 1990, Cengiz operated his own companies in the petroleum goods trade business. Once, he served as the chairman of the Turkish Employers' Union of Gasoline and Liquefied Petroleum Gas Dealers.

Sport executive
Cengiz was appointed a member of the by-law committee by the council of Galatasaray S.K. He was in charge of preparing a new by-law for the sports club. On 20 January 2018, Cengiz became the 37th president of Galatasaray S.K., winning with 1,703 of the 3,416 votes cast while 1,623 delegates voted for the defending president Dursun Özbek. His term ended in June 2021, and Burak Elmas succeeded him in the post.

Personal life and death
Cengiz was married and had a son named Sarper who was born in 1984.  

Cengiz died in Istanbul from cancer on 28 November 2021 at the age of 71. He had been ill since the first months of 2020. He was buried at Ulus Cemetery in Istanbul.

See also
 List of Galatasaray S.K. presidents
 Faculty of Political Science, Ankara University
 Galatasaray SK

References

External links

20th-century Turkish businesspeople
21st-century Turkish businesspeople
1949 births
2021 deaths
Ankara University Faculty of Political Sciences alumni
Burials at Ulus Cemetery
Deaths from cancer in Turkey
Galatasaray S.K. presidents
People from Nizip
Turkish civil servants